Enrique Bernardino Ferraro Barr (born June 20, 1970 in Montevideo, Uruguay) is a Uruguayan former football player. He played for clubs in Uruguay, Chile Bolivia and Ecuador.

Teams
  Bella Vista 1990-1992
  Barcelona 1993
  Defensor Sporting 1994
  Deportivo Quito 1995
  Danubio 1996
  Fénix 1997
  O'Higgins 1997
  Huachipato 1998
  Real Santa Cruz 1999
  Progreso 2000
  Rocha 2000
  Juventud Las Piedras 2001-2002
  Rentistas 2003-2004
  Central Español 2005-2006
  Rampla Juniors 2007-2008
  Atenas de San Carlos 2008

Titles
  Bella Vista 1990 (Uruguayan Cup)

Honours
  O'Higgins 1997 (Top Scorer Torneo Clausura Chilean Primera B Championship)

Personal life 
He is now divorced from Uruguayan supervedette and actress, Mónica Farro with whom he has a child named Diego.

References

External links
 
 

1970 births
Living people
Uruguayan footballers
Uruguayan expatriate footballers
Defensor Sporting players
Centro Atlético Fénix players
Atenas de San Carlos players
Juventud de Las Piedras players
C.A. Bella Vista players
Central Español players
Rampla Juniors players
C.A. Rentistas players
Danubio F.C. players
Rocha F.C. players
C.A. Progreso players
C.D. Huachipato footballers
S.D. Quito footballers
Barcelona S.C. footballers
O'Higgins F.C. footballers
Chilean Primera División players
Primera B de Chile players
Expatriate footballers in Chile
Expatriate footballers in Bolivia
Expatriate footballers in Ecuador
Association football forwards